Brynmawr railway station was a station which served Nantyglo and Brynmawr in the Welsh county of Brecknockshire.

History
The first section of the Merthyr, Tredegar and Abergavenny Railway from Abergavenny to Brynmawr was opened on 29 September 1862. The line was leased and operated by the London and North Western Railway (L&NWR) which acquired the smaller railway company on 30 June 1866. The Ebbw Vale extension opened in 1867, followed by an extension to the west by the Brynmawr and Blaenavon Railway which constructed a  line to Blaenavon which opened to goods traffic on 1 November 1869 and to passengers on 1 January 1870. The new line, which was on a 1 in 47 gradient fall towards Nantyglo, was jointly worked by the Great Western and the L&NWR, with traffic exchanged between the two companies at Nantyglo.

Brynmawr station was located to the south of the main town centre on an east–west embankment. To the north of the station was St Mary's Roman Catholic Chapel and School, while to the west was the Holy Trinity Church. The station, which had its entrance on the southside, had seven platforms were provided which were a mixture of stone-faced and timber construction. Platform 4 was a bay for Nantyglo which opened in 1906 and was perched on the edge of the embankment. The auto-trains for Blaenavon used platform 3. A glass-panelled footbridge linked the platforms. To the south of the station there were extensive sidings and a turntable suitable for coal tanks.

The first of Brynmawr's connections to be lost was the service to Pontypool via Blaenavon which was withdrawn on 5 May 1941. Then the line to Ebbw Vale closed on 3 February 1951, passenger services having ceased on 23 May 1949. Next was the Abergavenny to Merthyr line from which passenger services ceased on 4 January 1958. The last passenger service over the line was an SLS railtour on 5 January 1958 hauled by LNWR 0-8-0 49121 and LNWR 0-6-2- tank 58926. Final closure came in November 1959 when coal traffic from  ceased.  Finally, passenger services on the route to Nantyglo were withdrawn on 30 April 1962 with final closure on 4 November 1963. This was the date on which Brynmawr closed completely with the withdrawal of its goods services.

Present and future
The station site was cleared following the cessation of all traffic in November 1963. It is presently the site of a primary school.

However, due to redevelopment of the former alignment, any extension would only go as far as the embankment carrying the B4248 road towards Brynmawr. The proposed station would therefore be at roughly  opposite the Blaenant Industrial Estate.

References

Notes

Sources

Disused railway stations in Blaenau Gwent
Former London and North Western Railway stations
Railway stations in Great Britain opened in 1862
Railway stations in Great Britain closed in 1962
1862 establishments in Wales
1963 disestablishments in Wales